Searsia laevigata, the dune currant rhus, is a small, bushy, evergreen tree that occurs in rocky fynbos slopes and coastal shrub in South Africa.

Description
It looks very similar to its close relative Searsia glauca but has larger leaflets. It was previously classified as Rhus laevigata

Distribution
This species is primarily coastal, occurring in coastal dunes along the western and southern coast of the former Cape Province, South Africa. 

The low-growing variety villosa, with hairy (villose) leaflets, is exclusively coastal. 

However, the hairless variety Searsia laevigata var. laevigata, while occurring along the coast, also extends inland as far as the Little Karoo in the north, and Bredasdorp in the west.

Notes

References
 Van Wyk: Field Guide to Trees of Southern Africa, Struik, 1997.

laevigata
Endemic flora of South Africa
Flora of the Cape Provinces
Fynbos
Trees of South Africa